Ganeshi Lal  (born 1 March 1941) is an Indian politician and the incumbent Governor of Odisha.

Personal life 
Professor Ganeshi Lal was born in Sirsa, Haryana on 1 March 1941. With a brilliant educational career, he holds a degree in English Honours. He further went on to gain a post-graduate degree in Mathematics. He stood First Class First in FA, BA and MA Class and was a Gold Medalist. After completing his education, he joined academic profession and served as professor in different Government Colleges in Haryana between 1964 and 1991. Lal was married to Sushila Devi, who died on 23 November 2020 due to COVID-19.

Political career 
He has authored a celebrated book on Bhagvad Gita, 'Non-attached Attachment' running in its second edition, published by PEN IN Books.  He served as the President of the Bharatiya Janata Party, Haryana unit from 2003 to 2006.

Official meetings
He attended 2019 Convocation Ceremony of VSSUT.
He attended Convocation Ceremony 2019 which was held in Sambalpur University along with Principal secretary of P.M Narendra Modi, P.K Mishra.
He attended 38th Convocation Ceremony of OUAT.
He attended the 49th Convocation Ceremony of Utkal University (also known as the mother University in the state Odisha with an accreditation of A+ by NAAC), on 29 March 2019.

References

External links

Official Profile His Excellency  Governor of Odisha, Professor Ganeshi Lal 

1941 births
Living people
Governors of Odisha
People from Sirsa district
State cabinet ministers of Haryana
Bharatiya Janata Party politicians from Haryana
Haryana academics
Indian lecturers
Indians imprisoned during the Emergency (India)